This is a list of episodes for the Brat TV web series Chicken Girls, which premiered on September 5, 2017. As of 2021, 104 episodes have been aired.

Series overview

Episodes

Season 1 (2017)
The first season of the series, which introduces the original set of main characters: Rhyme, TK, Ellie, Quinn, Kayla, Birdie, Rooney, Harmony, Ace, Flash, Tim, and Luna. The first four episodes are named after days of the week.

Season 2 (2018)
Robby Robbins is introduced this season, as a main character. Monica is still a recurring character, but plays a bigger role than she had during season 1 in the 1st 5 episodes of the season. This season also introduces Frankie and Naomi, 2 new members of Attaway Dance Team who are recurring characters that only appear in this season.

Season 3 (2018)
Each episode is named after a musical. T.K. is bumped down to a recurring character. Drake, Ty, and Spike are added as main characters.

Season 4 (2019)
This is the season in which the character Ezra Grant, now a main character in the series, is introduced. Effie is also added as a new character. This is the only season where T.K. does not appear at all. Ace and Spike are now guest stars. As of this season, all of The Bs and Power Surge are gone except for Luna and Britney who are still on the show. The season's original air date was March 12, 2019 but was pushed back to March 19.

Season 5 (2019)
This is the season where Astrid and Wes are now main characters. Jesse is also added as a new character. Spike is a guest star once again, and TK guest stars near the end where he reveals he is staying for good.

Season 6 (2020)
TK returns as a main character. Gemma is added as a main character. Carlos, Tonya, Sadie, Jessica, and Benji are added as recurring characters. Robby is now a recurring character but despite appearing in 3 episodes, he only has 1 in-person appearance in the entire season (which is his 3rd and final appearance in the season), and his voice is only heard rather than him being seen in his 2nd appearance in the season.

Season 7 (2020)
PK, Claire, Jordan, Leyla, Gus, Bel, Darnell, and Eggie are introduced this season as the new main characters (alongside Harmony, Brittany, and Katie). The season's original premiere date was September 1, 2020 but was pushed back to September 8.

Season 8 (2021)
With Rhyme and her friends all grown up, Harmony has found her own squad of Chicken Girls. But with all their new interests, secrets and crushes, can this girl group survive middle school?

Season 9 (2021–22)
In season 9, new characters Poppy, Emerson and Yasmina are introduced. On December 14, 2021, Brat TV released the mid-season finale of season 9. The remainder of season 9 was released from February to April, 2022. This would also mark Harmony’s last season as a major character on the series, making her the last character to have any affiliation with the series’ original cast dating back to Season 1.

Season 10 (2022)

References

Lists of web series episodes
Lists of American teen drama television series episodes